Papa Ibra Tall (1935–2015) was a tapestry weaver, painter, and illustrator known for his role in the École de Dakar.

Biography 
Papa Ibra Tall was born in 1935 in Tivaouane, in the Thiès Region of Senegal. His artistic career began oil painting under the tutelage of amateur French painters in Dakar.  In 1955, he studied architecture at the École Spéciale d'Architecture in Paris, where he was exposed to the Négritude movement and provided illustrations for the Présence Africaine. He later attended the École nationale supérieure des Beaux-Arts and pursued instruction in Sèvres with the assistance of Senegalese president Léopold Sédar Senghor, where he studied painting, serigraphy, tapestry, mosaics, and comparative pedagogy.

Career 
Papa Ibra Tall returned to Senegal from France in 1960, founding the École de Dakar with Iba Ndiaye and Pierre Lods. He headed the Section de Recherches en Arts Plastiques Nègres. In his instruction, he sought to encourage the development of an "identifiable" Pan-African idiom, and preferred not to provide formal instruction for fear it would block what he believed to be the natural artistic creativity of African artists. At the behest of President Senghor, he founded the Manufacture Sénégalaise des Arts Décoratifs (MSAD) tapestry school in 1965.

Exhibitions 
Source:
 8th São Paulo Art Bienalle, Brazil, 1965.
 Festival Mondial des Arts Nègres, Dakar, 1966.
 1st Pan-African Festival of Algiers, 1969.
 1st Salon of Senegalese Visual Artists at the Musée Dynamique, Dakar, 1973.
 Dessins de Papa Ibra Tall, National Gallery of Art, Dakar, 1991.

References 

Senegalese artists
1935 births
2015 deaths
People from Thiès Region
École Spéciale d'Architecture alumni